Joan Silber is an American novelist and short story writer. She won the 2017 National Book Critics Circle Award in Fiction and the 2018 PEN/Faulkner Award for Fiction for her novel Improvement.

Biography

Joan Silber was born in 1945. She grew up in Millburn, New Jersey. She graduated from Sarah Lawrence College and obtained an M.A.  from New York University. She taught at NYU and now teaches at Sarah Lawrence College and lives in New York City.

Her work has been selected for The O. Henry Prize Stories six times 2003, 2004, 2007, 2013, 2015, and 2021, as well as in the Best American Short Stories 2015, and The Pushcart Prize. Her writing has appeared in The New Yorker, Ploughshares, The Paris Review, Tin House, Epoch, The Southern Review, Agni, The Colorado Review, and other publications.

Published work
Novels

 Secrets of Happiness (2021)
 Improvement (2017)
 The Size of the World (W.W. Norton, 2008)
 Lucky Us (Algonquin Books of Chapel Hill, 2001)
 In the City (Viking, 1987)
 Household Words (Penguin Books, 1980)

Short Story Collections

 Fools  (W.W. Norton, 2013)
 Ideas of Heaven: A Ring of Stories (W.W. Norton, 2004)
 In My Other Life (Sarabande Books, 2000)

Nonfiction
 The Art of Time in Fiction: As Long as It Takes (Graywolf Press, 2009)

Honors and awards

 2018 PEN/Faulkner Award for Improvement 
 2018 PEN/Malamud Award for Excellence in the Short Story
 2017 National Book Critics Circle Award in Fiction winner for Improvement
 2014 PEN/Faulkner Award, finalist for Fools
 2008 The Los Angeles Times Book Prize, finalist for The Size of the World
 2004 Story Prize, finalist for Ideas of Heaven
 2004 National Book Award, finalist for Ideas of Heaven 
 1981 Hemingway Foundation/PEN Award winner for Household Words

She has received grants from the Guggenheim Foundation, the National Endowment for the Arts and the New York Foundation for the Arts.

References

External links
 Joan Silber Biography on Ploughshares
 Interview: Barnes and Noble, Meet the Writers: Joan Silber
 The National Book Foundation > 2004 National Book Award Finalists > Joan Silber Biography
 Interview: The Believer > December 2004/January 2005 > Interview with Joan Silber

Year of birth missing (living people)
Living people
20th-century American novelists
20th-century American women writers
21st-century American novelists
21st-century American women writers
American women academics
American women novelists
Hemingway Foundation/PEN Award winners
National Endowment for the Arts Fellows
New York University alumni
The New Yorker people
Novelists from New Jersey
Novelists from New York (state)
PEN/Faulkner Award for Fiction winners
People from Millburn, New Jersey
Sarah Lawrence College alumni
Sarah Lawrence College faculty